The National Guard is part of the Hellenic Army and are voluntary corps, mainly located in areas near the frontiers, consisted of trained and armed volunteer men (and since 2019 women).

Historical background

The first unit in the Greek army with the name of "National Guard" was established in 1843 during the early reign of Otto of Greece. It was voluntary unit and consisted of men 18-24 years old.

Much later, in 1948, during the Greek Civil War were established the National Guard Defence Battalions (TEA), with a strongly anticommunist orientation. Their mission was supporting the regular Hellenic Army in national defence and internal security.

Present form
Due to their hard-line right-wing orientation, the TEA were disestablished in 1982 by the government of Andreas Papandreou, and replaced with the National Guard.

References

External links
 

1982 establishments in Greece
Military units and formations established in 1982
Military units and formations of the Hellenic Army
Reserve forces